5 Girls and a Dad is a family oriented Philippine drama created and developed by Lualhati Bautista for Net 25. Richard Quan plays the lead role of Lorenzo Legazpi, a widower raising his five daughters, who now makes his first lead role on television. The show is the first primetime drama series of Eagle Broadcasting Corporation and aired on Net 25 from January 23, 2012 to August 24, 2012.

Overview

Synopsis 
Lorenzo Legazpi (or simply "Enzo") is a taxi operator and a loving father to his four daughters, Mimay, Anna Liza, Alex and Valerie, and a devout husband to Veron (Quigaman). When Veron died after giving birth to her fifth daughter to Enzo, he faces the responsibility of raising his five daughters, most especially to his youngest daughter, Angel.

Cast and characters

Main cast 
Richard Quan as Lorenzo "Enzo" Legazpi
Precious Lara Quigaman as Veron Legazpi
Dixie Nedic as Mimay Legazpi
Kate Nizedel as Anna Liza Legazpi
Abby Quilnat as Alex Legazpi
Franchesca Salcedo as Valerie Legazpi
David Lou as  Joseph Legaspi

Extended cast 
Leo Martinez as Jupiter
Vangie Labalan as Venus

Special Guest Cast

References

See also 
List of programs previously broadcast by Net 25

Philippine drama television series
2012 Philippine television series debuts
2012 Philippine television series endings
Net 25 original programming
Filipino-language television shows